Josh Dueck (born January 13, 1981) is a Canadian alpine skier. He won a silver medal at the 2010 Winter Paralympics in the men's slalom sit-ski event. On February 3, 2012, Josh became the first person to perform a backflip on snow in a Sit Ski.

Personal life 
Dueck was born on January 13, 1981, in Kimberley, British Columbia and now resides at Vernon, British Columbia. He was a former freestyle skier and coach before he became disabled. He became disabled when he overshot a demonstration jump in March 2004, breaking his back and left him as a T11 classification. He told reporters, "I knew deeply and intuitively that it was a bad idea".

Career

Vancouver 2010 

Dueck has entered the 2010 Paralympics just 6 years after he became disabled. He won silver at the slalom for a time of 1:24.19. "I had a line in mind and I was able to stick to it. I took some chances, got lucky. Pretty sure I had some angels on my side for a few of those gates I was just clipping. Second is awesome." the 33-year-old said.

Accomplishments
Dueck won both silver and gold medals at the 2014 Winter Paralympics in Sochi, Russia, as well as a silver medal at the 2010 Winter Paralympics in Vancouver. As a sit-skier, he has also won gold in mono skier X at the 2011 Winter X Games, bronze at the 2012 Winter X Games, and has won multiple IPC World Cup podiums and is the 2009 world downhill champion. In February 2012, Dueck became the first sit-skier to complete a backflip on snow,– earning him world-wide notoriety and an appearance on The Ellen DeGeneres Show. He is an advocate for workplace safety and accessibility in sport, and in 2013 gave a TED Talk about his experiences.

References

External links
 
 
 
 
 YouTube: Josh Dueck's Story
 YouTube: Behind the Drive: Josh Dueck

1981 births
Living people
Canadian male alpine skiers
Paralympic alpine skiers of Canada
Paralympic gold medalists for Canada
Paralympic silver medalists for Canada
Paralympic medalists in alpine skiing
Alpine skiers at the 2010 Winter Paralympics
Alpine skiers at the 2014 Winter Paralympics
Medalists at the 2010 Winter Paralympics
Medalists at the 2014 Winter Paralympics
X Games athletes